The 1836 Connecticut gubernatorial election was held on April 4, 1836. Incumbent governor and Democratic nominee Henry W. Edwards was re-elected, defeating former governor, senator and Whig nominee Gideon Tomlinson with 53.93% of the vote.

General election

Candidates
Major party candidates

Henry W. Edwards, Democratic
Gideon Tomlinson, Whig

Results

References

1836
Connecticut
Gubernatorial